Breast diseases make up a number of conditions. The most common symptoms are a breast mass, breast pain, and nipple discharge.

A majority of breast diseases are noncancerous.

Tumor

A breast tumor is an abnormal mass of tissue in the breast as a result of neoplasia. A breast neoplasm may be benign, as in fibroadenoma, or it may be malignant, in which case it is termed breast cancer. Either case commonly presents as a breast lump. Approximately 7% of breast lumps are fibroadenomas and 10% are breast cancer, the rest being other benign conditions or no disease.

Phyllodes tumor is a fibroepithelial tumor which can be benign, borderline or malignant.

Breast cancer

Breast cancer is cancer of the breast tissues, most commonly arising from the milk ducts.  Worldwide, breast cancer is the leading type of cancer in women, accounting for 25% of all cases.  It is most common in women over age 50.

Signs of breast cancer may include a lump in the breast, a change in breast shape, dimpling of the skin, fluid coming from the nipple, a newly inverted nipple, or a red or scaly patch of skin.  Diagnosis may also be made when the cancer is asymptomatic, through breast cancer screening programs, such as mammograms.  Outcomes for breast cancer vary depending on the cancer type, extent of disease, and person's age. Survival rates in the developed world are high, with between 80% and 90% of those in England and the United States alive for at least 5 years.

Fibrocystic breast changes

Also called:  fibrocystic breast disease, chronic cystic mastitis, diffuse cystic mastopathy, mammary dysplasia

Infections and inflammations

These may be caused among others by trauma, secretory stasis/milk engorgement, hormonal stimulation, infections or autoimmune reactions.
Repeated occurrence unrelated to lactation requires endocrinological examination.

 bacterial mastitis
 mastitis from milk engorgement or secretory stasis
 mastitis
 chronic subareolar abscess
 tuberculosis of the breast
 syphilis of the breast
 retromammary abscess
 actinomycosis of the breast
 duct ectasia syndrome
 breast engorgement

Other breast conditions
 Mondor's disease
 Paget's disease of the breast
 nipple discharge, galactorrhea
 breast cyst
 mastalgia
 galactocoele

See also
Mammary gland

References

Further reading

External links 

Breast diseases